Alasdair Ian Fenton Urquhart (born 20 December 1945) is a Scottish–Canadian philosopher and emeritus professor of philosophy at the University of Toronto. He has made contributions to the field of logic, especially non-classical logic. One of his ideas is proving the undecidability of the relevance logic R. He also published papers in theoretical computer science venues, mostly on mathematical logic topics of relevance to computer science.

Early life 
Urquhart is a native of Scotland. He received his MA in philosophy from the University of Edinburgh in 1967. He then attended the University of Pittsburgh, receiving an MA and Ph.D. in 1973 under the supervision of Alan Ross Anderson and Nuel Belnap.

Career 
From 1973 to 1975, Urquhart was an assistant professor at Erindale College, University of Toronto Mississauga. He became an associate professor there in 1975. Starting in 1986, Urquhart was a professor of philosophy at the University of Toronto. 

From 1983 to 1989, Urquhart was a consulting editor for the Journal of Symbolic Logic. He was also an editor of Canadian Philosophical Monographs. In 2003, he became the managing editor of reviews for The Bulletin of Symbolic Logic. 

He is currently on the Council of the Division for Logic, Methodology and Philosophy of Science and Technology of the International Union of History and Philosophy of Science and Technology (2020–2023).

Selected publications 
 Urquhart, Alasdair and Rescher, Nicholas. Temporal Logic. New York: Springer Verlag, 1971. 
 Urquhart, Alasdair. "The Undecidability of Entailment and Relevant Implication."  Journal of Symbolic Logic 49:4 (1984): 1059–1073.
 Urquhart, Alasdair and Cook, Stephen A. "Functional Interpretations of Feasibly Constructive Arithmetic", Annals of Pure and Applied Logic, 1993; preliminary version at STOC'89
 "The Complexity of Decision Procedures in Relevance Logic II", Journal of Symbolic Logic 64:4 (1999): 1774–1802.

References

External links 
 DBLP publications

1945 births
Living people
Alumni of the University of Edinburgh
University of Pittsburgh alumni
Scottish emigrants to Canada
Academic staff of the University of Toronto
Scottish logicians
20th-century Scottish mathematicians
20th-century Scottish philosophers
Canadian logicians
20th-century Canadian mathematicians
20th-century Canadian philosophers